Tribal Areas can refer to:

Chittagong Hill Tracts in Bangladesh are considered as the tribal areas of Bangladesh
Federally Administered Tribal Areas in Pakistan
Provincially Administered Tribal Areas also in Pakistan
Tripura Tribal Areas Autonomous District Council in India

See also
List of U.S. state and tribal wilderness areas